Volodymyr Ariev is a Ukrainian journalist, film director, author of the project "Restricted Area". He also is the Member of Parliament of Ukraine since the 2007 Ukrainian parliamentary election, chairman of Ukrainian delegation in Parliament Assembly of Council of Europe in 2015-2019, PACE Vice-President (2015, 2018), President of PACE Committee for Culture, Education, Science and Media (2016-2017). He has a diplomatic rank of Extraordinary and Plenipotentiary Ambassador.

Biography
Volodymyr Ariev was born in Kyiv Ukraine on 31 March 1975.

Education 
 1992, Nature and Science Lyceum in Kyiv
 1998, Institute for Journalism affiliated with Kyiv National University
 1994, student of BBC World Service school, Kyiv

Career 
 February 1993 - October 1994, assistant reporter, stringer of Ukrainian and Russian BBC services, (Kyiv)
 October 1994 - January 1996, special correspondent, host of "Vikna-novyny" news program, "Internews"
 January 1996 - May 1996, special correspondent, information agency "Vikna"
 May - November 1996, host of the news block in "Good Morning Ukraine!", UT-1 channel
 November 1996 - September 2003, special correspondent, Information and Analytical service, TV channel Inter
 March 2003 - March 2004, independent journalist and author of the program "Non-province"(STB), freelance writer at weekly "Zerkalo Nedeli" ("Mirror Weekly"); special correspondent at JSC Television Information Agency "Profi TV"
 March 2004 - December 2005, - Director and author of the program "Closed Zone", "Channel 5"
 2007 - 5 Kanal stopped collaboration with Volodymyr Ariev producer center due to he ran for Parliamentary Elections. 
 
MP 6th Verkhovna Rada since November 2007, was elected by the lists of "Our Ukraine - People's Self-Defense Bloc"

Second term in MP office 7th Verkhovna Rada since November 2012, was elected in constituency 218, Kyiv for Batkivshchyna.

Third term in MP office 8th Verkhovna Rada since November 2014, was re-elected in constituency 218, Kyiv for Petro Poroshenko Bloc.

Since 2015 Chairman of Ukrainian delegation to PACE

PACE Vice-President (2015, 2018)

In 2016-2017 President of PACE Committee for Culture, Education, Science and Media, PACE General Rapporteur for media freedom and safety of journalists

Since September 2017 Ariev hosts a political talk show on the TV channel "Direct".

Ariev was elected to parliament 4th time for European Solidarity in the 2019 Ukrainian parliamentary election as number 17 of its election list.

Filmography
 Donetsk mafia. Reloaded. "Zmina" Studio, 2007.
 Kyiv tragedy, 1960th. 2008
 The Secrets of the Black Sea. 2009
 Ukraine: from democracy to chaos. Co-production, Grain de Sables (France), 2012

Awards 
 Awardee of V.Marchenko Prize for the best media coverage of the human rights theme (2004)
 Awardee of О. Krivenko Prize "For progress in journalism" (2005)
 Winner of the national prize "TV-triumph" (2005, 2006)

Family 
Ariev is married to Natalka Fitsych (b. 1977), editor-in-chief of the production company "Restricted Area". They have a daughter Yaryna (b. 2000).

See also 
 List of Ukrainian Parliament Members 2007
 Verkhovna Rada

References

External links 
  Volodymyr Ariev's profile at Verkhovna Rada of Ukraine official web-site

Living people
1975 births
Journalists from Kyiv
5 Kanal people
STB (TV channel) people
1+1 (TV channel) people
Ukrainian television personalities
Sixth convocation members of the Verkhovna Rada
Seventh convocation members of the Verkhovna Rada
Eighth convocation members of the Verkhovna Rada
Film people from Kyiv
University of Kyiv, Journalism Institute alumni
Ninth convocation members of the Verkhovna Rada
Politicians from Kyiv